Nikolay Mikhailovich Chagin (Николай Михайлович Чагин; 1823, Oryol – 1909) was a Russian architect active primarily in Vilnius and the Crimea. He took part in the Siege of Sevastopol and served as Vilno's main architect for 38 years. Chagin mastered the Byzantine Revival and several other revivalist styles, often blending them at will. His church buildings include:
 Nativity Cathedral, Riga
 Cathedral of the Theotokos, Vilnius
 St. Paraskeva Church, Vilnius
 St. Euphrosyne Church, Vilnius
 St. Catherine Church, Vilnius
 Bell tower of St. Anne's Church, Vilnius
 St Simeon and St Anne's Cathedral, Jelgava
 St. Mary's Church, Grodno
 Church of the Resurrection, Foros
 The interiors of the Chersonesus Cathedral

See also 
 Neo-Byzantine architecture in the Russian Empire

1823 births
1909 deaths
People from Oryol
People from Orlovsky Uyezd (Oryol Governorate)
Russian military personnel of the Crimean War
19th-century architects from the Russian Empire
History of Vilnius
Burials at Nikolskoe Cemetery